Racism in association football is the abuse of players, officials, and fans because of their skin colour, nationality, or ethnicity. Some may also be targeted because of their association with an opposing team. However, there have been instances of individuals being targeted by their own fans.

Racism in association football has been most studied in the European Union and Russia, although racist incidents have been reported abroad. In response to racist incidents at association football matches, in May 2013, FIFA, the international governing body of association football, announced new measures to deal with racism in the sport.

The topic of racism in association football has been widely covered by the media as well as academic studies.

Responses
In October 2018, German player Antonio Rüdiger, who has been a victim of racist abuse stated that authorities needed to do more to deal with racism in the sport.

In April 2019, UEFA President Aleksander Ceferin said referees should stop games if a racist incident occurs, whilst FIFA President Gianni Infantino called for "harsh sanctions" to deal with racism in the sport.

In April 2019, Raheem Sterling, called for racist abuse to be punished with an automatic nine-point deduction for clubs, instead of handing out fines to the individuals directly performing the abuse.

In April 2019, the Professional Footballer's Association launched a social media campaign to make a stand against racial abuse calling upon social media organizations and the game's authorities to take action against racism.

In November 2019 Leon Balogun said there needed to be a collective response from players to racism.

Africa

Senegal
Prior to Senegal's group-stage match against Japan in the 2018 FIFA World Cup, business magnate Alan Sugar tweeted a photo of the Senegal team with the caption: "I recognise some of these guys from the beach in Marbella. Multitasking, resourceful chaps". The tweet was criticised for being racist, with Osasu Obayiuwana, the associate editor of the New African magazine claiming that Sugar was playing "to a racist stereotype" and that "no Senegalese or African will see this as funny". Sugar quickly apologised for the remark, tweeting "I misjudged me  earlier tweet. It was in no way intended to cause offence, and clearly my attempt at humour has backfired. I have deleted the tweet and am very sorry".

In March 2022, the Egyptian national team said they had been racially abused by Senegal fans.

South Africa 
During the 20th century until 1991, South Africa had segregation policies and segregated football leagues in which the South Africans designated "black" race were not allowed to play in the Football Association of South Africa. During the mid-1950s attempts by mainly South African blacks to integrate the sport were stifled by FASA. In 1961 the FASA was suspended by the International Federation of Association Football for not complying with desegregation policies. During 1963 the ban was briefly lifted until it was reinstated in 1964 and remained in place for 28 years. In 1973 the South African games were held, and attempts by the South African government to keep the games segregated and the teams racially determined and confined led to the International Federation of Association Football to pull its support from the event. They were drawn in due to the promise of it being a multiracial event, but upon discovering that the teams were racially determined and the sports events themselves had segregated attendance, FIFA backed out. The South African Football Association (SAFA) was formed in December 1991 right before the end of Apartheid on South Africa, and has no racial requirements for play and entry.

Tunisia 
Following the defeat of Tunisia's national football team to Equatorial Guinea in the 2015 African Cup of Nations, at least twelve attacks were reported to have occurred in the capital and the southern city of Sfax. Some of these attacks were even against darker skinned Tunisians due to their resemblance to the sub-Saharan country. This was extended to social media through posts which focused on enslaving blacks and letting them be killed by Boko Haram, a radical group.

In September 2022, during a friendly match between Brazil and Tunisia in Paris, Brazilian striker Richarlison had bananas thrown at him by fans.

Zambia
Hanif Adams, the owner of Lusaka Dynamos, was subject to racist remarks due to his Indian heritage while running for president of the Football Association of Zambia (FAZ). Some individuals have been cited saying that a foreigner should not run FAZ. An individual when asked for reasoning stated that, "For the sake of national pride and patriotism, Faz should be run by indigenous black Zambians and not Indians or Pakistanis." Lusaka Dynamos neglected to back down from the race and told BBC Sport, "I am very disappointed for people bringing race issues into matters of football or any matter concerning the development of any country."

Asia
Football racism and violence have decreased considerably during the 1990s through appropriate legislation such as the Football Offences Act (1991) which made racist chanting unlawful. However, racist chanting has not completely disappeared and much current abuse is linked to Asians, resulting in many still feeling intimidated. Institutionalized racism plays a large part in reducing prospects for footballing recruits from Asian communities. In a study conducted by Bains and Patel, it was recorded that over 90 percent of the Asian Heritage respondents saw both institutional racism and the existence of racist supporters as being barriers to entry into the professional game. Many cases of segregation have been recorded resulting in many Asians playing in 'Asian only leagues', thus distancing themselves further from mainstream society and popular culture. Subjection to overt racist abuse from coaches, players and spectators is a primary common denominator for many Asian footballers leading to feelings of isolation and exclusion from after-training socializing and ritual young male bonding.

Researchers who wrote the Asians Can't Play Football report somewhat presciently uncovered a culpable order of ignorance and thinly disguised racism that had proscribed any sustained South Asian progression in the game. Numerous problematic stereotypes still have a firm hold over the Asian identity. The standard stereotype of South Asian people is one of the submissive, naturally placid and physically frail individual. It has been stated that the Asian build is not that of a footballer and that the stereotype of "weak Asian" is influenced by notions of 'race' and issues of national identity. Common stereotypes list the Asian pupil as typically seen as physically frail, lacking in stamina and likely to underachieve. A 'Commission for Racial Equality (CRE) survey highlighted that there were only 10 Asian players at Premier League academies' 48 and in 2006, there were 'only four Asian players in the professional game'. These stereotypes exist because there is an under-achievement and if they subsist, 'scouts, coaches, and managers' will not visit places of high Asian population. What unites most South Asian teams is the common experience of racism and a particular racism that is parasitically exacted through football.

China

On 4 August 2018, Demba Ba was the victim of alleged racial abuse by Changchun Yati player Zhang Li.

In June 2020, Odion Ighalo revealed that in one game in China he got called all sorts of names and reported it to the FA, but he did not press forward with it because he “don’t like to drag issues out”.

Hong Kong

There were reports of targeted racial attacks against the Philippine national team while they competed at Mongkok Stadium in a friendly against Hong Kong. The event was held on 4 June 2013. Hong Kong fans reportedly called their counterparts "slaves", threw bottles at them and booed at the Philippine national anthem. Hong Kong lost the friendly match to the Philippines, 1–0. At the end of the game, Hong Kong fans reportedly threw debris at the Philippine team and gallery, occupied mostly by wives and children of the players.

Benny Chan, spokesman of the Hong Kong Football Association, announced that the football body will release an official report to FIFA and the public after its investigation is completed. Philippine football officials are likewise waiting for the report before filing a complaint to FIFA.

India
In May 2020, Indian captain Sunil Chhetri faced racist comments during his Instagram Live session with Indian cricket captain Virat Kohli.

Japan

In March 2014, J1 League club Urawa Red Diamonds had to play to an empty stadium; their fans had been banned following racist banners displayed in previous matches.

Malaysia

In February 2019, Antonio German left Malaysian club Selangor one month into a one-year contract; he later said he left the club due to racism.

Philippines

The Philippine Football Federation filed a complaint with GMA Network over a comment made by news anchor Arnold Clavio over controversial remarks directed at the Philippines national football team. A popular radio and television newscaster and program host of morning news show Unang Hirit, Clavio was quoted as saying that foreign-born players are not Filipinos (emphasizing the fact that they were not born in the Philippines). Clavio later retracted this statement, insisting that he had not intended to offend anyone.

Another racial incident occurred during a friendly match between the Philippines and Indonesia on 5 June 2012. A number of Indonesian fans were observed to be chanting "Hindi kayo Pilipino!" ("You are not Filipinos!") at Filipino players of non-Philippine ancestry.

South Korea

Federico Valverde was accused of making a racist gesture by pulling his eyes back into a slit when celebrating a goal, at the Under-20 World Cup in South Korea.

In the 2018 FIFA World Cup, South Korea was a target of racism by Mexican television hosts following South Korea's win over Germany. After Germany's defeat, the two Mexican hosts, on-air, were seen pulling their eyes back into a slit. The hosts, following the incident, were fired by Telemundo, the television network they were employed by. After the same match, Mexican soccer supporters rushed to the South Korean embassy to celebrate. The supporters were also seen pulling their eyes back.

Europe

In European association football, there is racism operating at the institutional and fan cultural levels. In England, the upper levels of authority are majority white and give jobs as coaches or other positions to other already-known white men rather than making public job postings. Stereotypes about coaches of colour, that they are more physical than intellectual, limit the accessibility of people of colour into the football industry. There are also legislative restrictions that limit the number of 'non-citizens' within a team in ⅓ of the countries in the EU, specifically targeting certain minorities. Therefore, there is 'invisible centrality of whiteness' that permeates the upper levels of the football system.

The stereotypes also apply to the players and prevent them from being treated well during matches, as seen in the racist chants heard during matches. South Asian players are considered "static" and "homogenous" while black players are considered to be "'difficult', 'bad tempered' and 'lacking in social etiquette" by clubs in Netherlands. Minority groups are expected to leave behind their cultural identities when joining a team and are encouraged to conform to the dominant norms perpetuated by white culture. And once the players are able to break into the system, it is difficult for them to work their way up into management or coaching. Within local areas such as Amsterdam, a sort of neighborhood nationalism develops that also contributes to this discrimination towards players of different origins.

There have been a few groups who have attempted to assuage the problem of racial discrimination in European football such as the UEFA (Union of European Football Associations) who held a seminar in Amsterdam encouraging racial equality in the industry with attendees from countries across Europe. A campaign called 'Let's Kick Racism Out of Football' was launched in 1993 in Britain to also increase awareness and facilitate dialogue about the issue.

Azerbaijan

In November 2020, UEFA fined Azerbaijani club Qarabağ FK €100,000 after the club's PR and media manager Nurlan Ibrahimov made a hate speech on social network calling to "kill all the Armenians, old and young, without distinction" amid the Nagorno-Karabakh war. UEFA also announced that it has life banned the Qarabağ official for the "racist and other discriminatory conduct” targeting Armenians. Subsequently Ibrahimov was declared wanted in Armenia.

Belgium 

Oguchi Onyewu, an American of Nigerian descent, has been punched and shouted at by racist fans while playing for Standard Liège. He has also had incidents with other players, such as Jelle Van Damme, who, according to Onyewu, repeatedly called him a "dirty ape" during the 2008–09 Championship playoff, even after Onyewu relayed the information to the referees. Van Damme denied the accusations following the match, and claimed that Onyewu had called him a "dirty Flemish". Approximately two weeks later, on 2 June 2009, it was announced by Onyewu's lawyer that he was suing Van Damme in an effort to end on-field racism in European football.

Zola Matumona left FC Brussels after he accused club chairman Johan Vermeersch of making racist remarks towards him during a crisis meeting at the struggling club. He is reported to have told Matumona to "think about other things than trees and bananas".

In December 2021 Anderlecht head coach Vincent Kompany was racially abused by Club Bruges fans during a match.

Bulgaria

In 2011 England national team players Ashley Young, Ashley Cole and Theo Walcott were subjected to racist abuse by Bulgarian fans.

In 2013 fans of Levski Sofia unveiled a banner wishing 'happy birthday' to Adolf Hitler. In 2018 Levski Sofia were fined after fans, including children, were seen making Nazi salutes.

In September 2019 the England national team said they were going to prepare a plan for dealing with possible racist abuse during a forthcoming game in Bulgaria. The plan was later reiterated by player Tammy Abraham, while Southgate said he understood why Bulgarian footballing authorities had been offended. Bulgarian national team manager Krasimir Balakov responded by saying racism was more of a problem in England than Bulgaria. The match, which resulted in a 6–0 England victory, was marred by racist chants and salutes from some Bulgarian fans, and was halted twice as a result. England player Jordan Henderson said the players wanted to make the Bulgarian fans "suffer" for their racist abuse with a big defeat.

The Bulgarian Prime Minister Boyko Borissov told Borislav Mihaylov, the head of the Bulgarian Football Union, to resign, which he did later that day. National team manager Balakov claimed not to have heard any racist chanting, while goalkeeper Plamen Iliev defended the fans, saying they had been well behaved. Balakov also later resigned his role as national team manager.

UEFA president Aleksander Čeferin said they would "wage war on the racists", and would decide on a punishment for Bulgaria. The next day UEFA announced that the Bulgarian FA would be fined 75,000 euros and forced to play two matches behind closed doors.

Four fans were later arrested by police, and were fined and banned by the Bulgarian FA. Five more fans were then arrested. By 29 October 2019 there had been 12 arrests.

In May 2022, the players of CSKA Sofia had bananas and bottles thrown at them by fans who were angered after the team lost the Bulgarian Cup Final against archrivals Levski Sofia. Subsequently, four of CSKA's black players refused to play in their team's next match against Botev Plovdiv. In June 2022, CSKA Sofia's manager Alan Pardew confirmed that he is leaving the club, citing as one of the principal reasons the racism directed at the players and his assistant Alex Dyer by a small group of organized fans.

Croatia

Henri Belle moved to Croatia at the beginning of 2011, signing with Istra 1961. He drew attention to himself both by good games and through receiving racist taunts from Bad Blue Boys.

In April 2018, Dinamo Zagreb were punished for the racist actions of their fans.

France

On 14 April 1990, during a 1989-90 season match between Girondins de Bordeaux and Olympique Marseille, the Cameroonian goalkeeper Joseph-Antoine Bell was victim of racist acts at his return at Stade Vélodrome when he played for Bordeaux- During the entire match, some Marseille ultras threw bananas towards him and taunted him with monkey chants and the racist chant "Joseph tu pues, va te laver le cul!" ("Joseph you stink, go to wash your ass!") on the notes of Serge Gainsbourg's song Couleur café. This incident revealed to the broad daylight the rise of racism in the French stadia during the late 1980s, to incite the French club officials to look into said problem to remediate.

In January 2005, as part of an anti-racism initiative in Ligue 1, Paris Saint-Germain's players wore all-white jerseys and the opposing Lens players wore all-black during a French league match. The move backfired after racist elements among PSG's crowd in the Kop of Boulogne sung "Come on the whites". The racist overtone was exacerbated by monkey chants from the Boulogne crowd whenever a Lens player touched the ball.

On 23 November 2006 in a game between Paris Saint-Germain and Haopel Tel Aviv, a police officer, as well as many players on the field were targets of racial slurs. The police officer being chanted at threw teargas into the stands and shot his gun, killing one and injuring another.

On 18 April 2007, Lyon player Milan Baroš was accused of racially abusing Rennes' Stéphane Mbia by implying that Mbia smelt. On 4 May, he was found guilty of the gesture, but found not guilty of racism, and was banned for three league matches.

On 17 September 2007, Libourne's Burkinabe player Boubacar Kébé was abused by fans of Bastia; he was red-carded for retaliating. In February 2008, Bastia was again at the centre of controversy when their fans unfurled a racist banner, again aimed at Kébé, which delayed the kick-off of the match by three minutes.

On 17 February 2008, Abdeslam Ouaddou of Valenciennes was racially abused by a fan from opponents Metz; Metz and the Ligue de Football Professionnel announced that they would be suing the fan in question. The match referee did not see the incident, and so booked Ouaddou for challenging the fan. Valenciennes Chairman Francis Decourrière later demanded that the match be replayed "in front of children from Valenciennes and Metz". Following this incident, the French Football Federation made steps to introduce harsher punishments.

In March 2008, Bastia's Frédéric Mendy claimed he had been racially abused by Grenoble fans.

In November 2013, former defender and the France national team's most-capped player, Lilian Thuram, has said white players need to show solidarity with players who receive racist abuse, saying, "The action of not saying anything – somehow – it makes you an accomplice."

On 13 November 2020, during the match between Paris Saint-Germain and Olympique Marseille, the PSG striker Neymar risked to be suspended for 10 matches after racially abusing Marseille's Japanese fullback Hiroki Sakai twice by calling him a "fucking Chinese" after telling Sakai to "go away" after Marseille player Alvaro Gonzalez called Neymar ("fucking monkey" after the latter called Gonzalez a "fucking faggot".

On 8 December 2020 a Champions League match between Paris Saint-Germain and Istanbul Basaksehir was suspended after the fourth official allegedly used a racist term towards Istanbul assistant coach, Pierre Webó. The incident occurred 14 minutes into the game. Istanbul players left the pitch in protest with PSG players following. The match was abandoned and was scheduled to recommence on 9 December.

On 29 November 2021 after a 1-0 win from Troyes, South Korean striker Suk Hyun-jun was racially abused by reserve players of Marseille, who were caught saying "Le samouraï nous a decoupé deux fois. ("The samurai cut down us twice."), when the South Korean striker made a late tackle on Marseille player Pape Gueye, which was followed by "Il va faire des sushis" ("He [Suk] is going to make some sushi [out of him]."), around 10 minutes before the end of the match. Three days later Marseille condemned the incident stating "Olympique de Marseille joined the Troyes club in strongly condemning the remarks made towards Suk Hyun-jun... OM also offers its full support to the Troyes player".

In September 2022, during a friendly match between Brazil and Tunisia in Paris, Brazilian striker Richarlison had bananas thrown at him by fans.

In November 2022, a Spanish television crew during the 2022 FIFA World Cup caught Argentinian fans singing chants against the France national football team claiming "they are from Angola", and singled out Kylian Mbappe in particular; the chant also had homophobic and transphobic slurs.

In December 2022, Kylian Mbappe, Kingsley Coman, Randal Kolo Muani, and Aurelien Tchouameni were racially abused after their team's loss in the 2022 FIFA World Cup Final.

Germany

In 1994, Borussia Dortmund star Júlio César threatened to leave the club after he was refused admission to a local nightclub because of him being black.

FC St. Pauli fans responded decisively to outbreaks of racism in the German game. With the slogan, Gegen rechts ('Against the Right'), a combination of fans and students took to the club's terraces in 1992 to protest against politically motivated racism.

In December 1992, three months after the Rostock-Lichtenhagen riots, all the teams in the German League followed the St. Pauli lead and, over one weekend, all players played in shirts displaying the slogan "Mein Freund ist Ausländer" ("My friend is a foreigner"). The German Sports Youth's 1995 "No Chance for Hatred" campaign has promoted activities against racism and xenophobia on a national scale, encouraging local clubs to participate. This campaign has not spurred German football authorities into further action.

In 1996, Merkel 1996 reports that they vehemently refuse to acknowledge that racism is a major problem, and dismiss racist abuse as isolated incidents which are unrelated to the sport. Most of their measures are concerned with law and order — reducing violence at matches — but anti-racist action is very sparse.

Racism in German football is much more subtle than in other parts of Europe; monkey chanting have been replaced with codes, such as the number 88, which stands for "HH" or "Heil Hitler" ("H" is the eighth letter of the alphabet in both German and English). Some teams, for example Hannover 96, have banned such symbols from their stadiums.

In December 2005, in a game between FC Energie Cottbus and Dynamo Dresden, Cottbus displayed a large banner with the word "Juden" lined with the two stars of David. The "d" in "Juden" was based on the emblem of Dynamo Dresden. No penalties on this act of antisemitism were imposed nor was the banner confiscated, though it was quite publicized in the media.

On 25 March 2006, in a match between Sachsen Leipzig and Hallescher FC, Leipzig's Nigerian midfielder Adebowale Ogungbure was spat at and called a "nigger" and "ape" by opposition fans, who later aimed monkey noises at him. In retaliation he placed two fingers above his mouth in reference to Hitler's mustache and performed a Nazi salute. Ogungbure was arrested by German police, as it is illegal to make Nazi gestures for political or abusive purposes, but criminal proceedings were dropped 24 hours later.

In April 2006, in a match between St. Pauli and Chemnitzer FC, visiting Chemnitz fans stormed Turkish-owned stores chanting "Sieg Heil" and waving imitation Nazi flags. Some shouted, "We're going to build a subway from St Pauli to Auschwitz."

Ghana-born German international striker Gerald Asamoah has frequently been the target of racist abuse.  On 10 September 2006, Hansa Rostock were investigated for racist abuse in a friendly game and were subsequently found guilty; the team was fined $25,000.

On 19 August 2007, it was announced that Borussia Dortmund goalkeeper Roman Weidenfeller would be investigated by the German Football Association (DFB) after apparently calling Asamoah a "black pig".

On 4 February 2007, a racist German football fan was apprehended by fellow fans during a match between Energie Cottbus and VfL Bochum, and faces a lifetime ban. Racist chants in Cottbus are said to be commonplace.

Torsten Ziegner was given a five-match ban in October 2008 for racially abusing Nigerian player Kingsley Onuegbu during a match against Eintracht Braunschweig.

On 22 July 2018, Mesut Özil (of Turkish origin) announced his retirement from the German national team, citing racism. He Tweeted in his statement posted on Twitter, Özil wrote: "In the eyes of Grindel and his supporters, I am German when we win, but I am an immigrant when we lose." The incident followed controversy in the German media following his photo with Turkish President Recep Tayyip Erdoğan.

In February 2020, an entire stadium chanted “Nazis out” during a game between Preussin Munster and Wurzburger Kickers after a fan made monkey noises towards defender Leroy Kwadwo. On 20 March 2021, Borussia Dortmund midfielder Jude Bellingham received racist abuse on Instagram after his side drew 2–2 with FC Köln. In May 2021, Hertha Berlin sacked Jens Lehmann after a racist WhatsApp message to Dennis Aogo was made public.

Hungary

On 8 June 2021, prior to a friendly game between Hungary and the Republic of Ireland, the Irish players had been booed by Hungarian fans prior to kick-off for taking the knee in a symbolic gesture against racism.

On 2 September 2021, England players Raheem Sterling and Jude Bellingham were both racially abused in Hungary’s World Cup qualifier game with England and fans loudly booed the English players prior to kick off for taking the knee to protest against racism. Hungary’s players and manager Marco Rossi had asked supporters to respect England’s gesture before the match. England's taking of the knee was again booed by Hungary fans (primarily children) in June 2022.

Italy 

In 1984, during a Derby della Mole match, Juventus supporters racially abused Torino's Brazilian midfielder Léo Júnior by displaying banners with racist phrases. In retaliation, Torino's fans responded with a banner with written Meglio negro che juventino ("Better [being a] negro than a Juventus fan"). In In that same year, Júnior also suffered another incident of racism. After Torino played an away match against AC Milan, Milan's supporters repeatedly shouted insults and spat at him while he was going out of the field with his mother and his godfather.

In 1989, after Udinese paid  Standard Liège £ 1.500.000 to sign Israeli striker Ronny Rosenthal, the team directors were under pressure from Hooligans Teddy Boys, an extremist fringe of the Udinese's ultras, which sent blackmail letter signed with a swastika to club president Giampaolo Pozzo to not sign a Jewish footballer and vandalized the club's headquarters with antisemitic writings such as Non vogliamo ebrei al Friuli ("We don't want Jews at the Friuli"), "Rosenthal, vai al forno" ("Rosenthal, go to the oven"). and Rosenthal Go Home, this latter being accompanied by a skull with crossed bones. As a result of this intimidatory behaviour, Udinese signed Abel Balbo instead. 
The media outcry resulted in a parliamentary interrogation, and later, Rosenthal sued the club for moral damages: in 1995, the Italian judicial authorities found the club responsible of discriminatory behaviour, sentencing it to a compensation of 61 million lire.

Black footballers playing in the Serie A top flight in 1992–93 were also racially abused. Two black Dutch players, Ruud Gullit and Aron Winter, have spoken out against such racist taunts. Their complaints spurred a day of action on 13 December 1992, with the slogan "No al razzismo!" ("No to racism") being paraded by all players in the two Italian divisions.

Paul Ince also complained about open abuse during his spell with Inter Milan in Italy between 1995 and 1997.

On 27 November 2005, Marco Zoro attempted to stop the Messina–Inter match by leaving the field with the ball after being tormented by racist taunts from some Inter supporters. He was eventually convinced to keep playing by other players, notably by Inter's Adriano. These facts then brought strong and unanimous condemnations by the whole football community within Italy, and a five-minute delay for an anti-racism display for all the matches to be played in the next week in the country. The actions of the Inter supporters were also brought to the attention of the European football governing body UEFA and the EU.

In April 2009, Inter's Mario Balotelli, an Italian footballer of Ghanaian descent, was subjected to racial abuse from Juventus fans. They were handed a one-game home fan ban as a result. At UEFA Euro 2012 playing for Italy, he fell victim to monkey chants during a match against Spain. After Italy defeated England in the quarter-finals, Italian newspaper Gazzetta dello Sport published a cartoon depicting Balotelli as King Kong on top of Big Ben. After his move from Milan to Liverpool in August 2014, he was the target of more than 8,000 abusive posts on social media between that time, and by March 2015, more than 4,000 of these posts were racist in nature.

On 3 January 2013, then-Milan midfielder Kevin Prince-Boateng, as well as the remainder of his Milan teammates, walked off the pitch early in a friendly match against lower league side Pro Patria after enduring racial abuse from fans of the latter.

On 11 May 2014, bananas were thrown at Milan's Kévin Constant and Nigel de Jong, both black, by Atalanta fans during their Milan's 2–1 defeat. Atalanta were later fined €40,000.

On 12 June 2015, Croatian National Soccer Team supporters marked a swastika on the soccer pitch prior to their match against the Italian National Soccer Team. As a punishment, The Union of European Football Associations (UEFA) ordered a £70,000 fine to the Croatians. On top of the fine, the Croatian team was forced to play their next two home matches in an empty stadium.

In April 2019, Juventus forward Moise Kean was subject to racist chants by Cagliari fans. Juventus teammate Leonardo Bonucci was heavily criticised after stating that Kean was partly to blame by his celebration which caused further jeers, by England international Raheem Sterling who deemed the comments 'laughable', compatriot Mario Balotelli, English singer Stormzy, and former Juventus player Paul Pogba. Bonucci implied that Kean's celebration caused further jeers, stating to Sky Sport Italia: "Kean knows that when he scores a goal, he has to focus on celebrating with his teammates. He knows he could've done something differently too. There were racist jeers after the goal, Blaise heard it and was angered. I think the blame is 50–50, because Moise shouldn't have done that and the Curva should not have reacted that way. We are professionals, we have to set the example and not provoke anyone." Later, he made a post on Instagram which read "Regardless of everything, in any case... no to racism." In response to the criticism, the following day, Bonucci posted on Instagram: "After 24 hours I want to clarify my feelings. Yesterday I was interviewed right at the end of the game, and my words have been clearly misunderstood, probably because I was too hasty in the way I expressed my thoughts. Hours and years wouldn't be enough to talk about this topic. I firmly condemn all forms of racism and discrimination. The abuses are not acceptable at all and this must not be misunderstood."

In August 2019, Romelu Lukaku was racially abused by Cagliari opposition fans. He later said that the sport was "going backwards" on racism. An Inter fan group called Curva Nord later said that the monkey chants from opposition fans were a sign of respect towards Lukaku. Italian TV pundit Luciano Passirani was later banned for making racist comments about Lukaku. On 15 September 2019, Franck Kessie was reportedly racially abused by Hellas Verona fans during a match with AC Milan. On 16 September 2019, Hellas Verona released a statement on their Twitter account and denied the happening. Later that month, Piara Powar of anti-discriminatory body Fare said that "the rot is deep" when discussing racism in Italian football.

In September 2019, FIFA President Gianni Infantino said the Italian FA should issue stadium bans for racist fans/clubs. Later that month Roma said they had banned a fan for racially abusing Juan Jesus.

In October 2019, Lazio were punished with a fine and a closed stadium after fans had been racist. In the same month, Sampdoria and England Under-21s midfielder Ronaldo Vieira was the target of alleged monkey chants from Roma fans in the 0-0 draw between the two sides.

In November 2019, Mario Balotelli was racially abused by opposition fans from Hellas Verona; he kicked the ball into the crowd and threatened to walk off the pitch. Balotelli later described the fans as "small minded". Hellas Verona banned the club's ultra leader from its games until June 2030, after a subsequent interview with him in which he openly called Balotelli racial slurs.

In December 2019 the Corriere dello Sport newspaper was criticised by AS Roma for using a 'Black Friday' headline accompanied by photographs of black players Romelu Lukaku and Chris Smalling. Later that month Serie A launched an anti-racism campaign featuring cartoon monkeys, which was criticised, with club AC Milan distancing itself from the campaign. Serie A later apologised.

On 12 September 2021, Tiemoue Bakayoko and Franck Kessie were targets of racial abuse by Lazio fans after Milan's 2-0 win. The incident was reported to be examined by the Italian Football Federation after a complaint from Milan. Bakayoko responded on Instagram: "To some Lazio fans and their racist cries towards to me and my brother [Kessie]. We are strong and proud of our skin colour. I have all my confidence in our club to identify them."

On 4 October 2021, following Napoli's 2-1 win against Fiorentina, Kalidou Koulibaly along with several other black players of Napoli including Victor Osimhen and André-Frank Zambo Anguissa were subjected to monkey chants. Fiorentina's general manager Joe Barone had publicly apologised to the players targeted. Koulibaly posted on Twitter calling for those who perpetrated the racial abuse to receive lifetime bans.

In October 2021 during an under-21 European Championship between Sweden and Italy, Swedish player Anthony Elanga was allegedly racially abused by an opponent. Italy denied the allegation in a statement: "With regards to the Swedish FA's claim and published by various media outlets, the FIGC deny in the strongest way possible the one of our under-21 players, during the Italy-Sweden game played in Monza yesterday, aimed a racist insult at an opposition player - an incident which, as far as we are aware, has not been founded by any match official or UEFA delegate".

On 20 March 2022, Milan players Fikayo Tomori and Mike Maignan were racially abused by Cagliari supporters after a 1-0 victory; Milan manager Stefano Pioli said both players told him they overheard racial abuse from the Cagliari end. Cagliari striker Joao Pedro claimed the allegations are false and defended his club's fans.

In January 2023, Lazio were ordered to close part of their stadium due to racist chants from their fans.

Lithuania

On 24 March 2007, in a match between France and Lithuania, a banner was unfurled by Lithuanian supporters that depicted a map of Africa, painted with the French flag colors (blue, white and red), with a slogan of "We Support French Diversity."

Montenegro

In a match between Rangers and Zeta in August 2007, Rangers players DaMarcus Beasley (an African American) and Jean-Claude Darcheville (a black Frenchman) were subjected to racist abuse by Zeta players and Zeta were later fined £9,000.

In March 2019, during a match between Montenegro and England, several England players were allegedly subjected to monkey chants from Montenegro fans. UEFA charged the Montenegro FA with racist behaviour. Ex-player John Barnes said calls for players to walk off the pitch wouldn't work.

As of April 2019, UEFA has punished Montenegro for their fans' racial abuse to some of the black players in the England national team. It occurred in a Euro 2020 qualifier between the two sides. The punishment includes paying a 20,000 euro fine and being forced to play their next qualifying match behind closed doors in an empty stadium. The Football Association has commented by saying that they hope the punishment "sends out a message" to those who feel inclined to racially abuse others.

Netherlands

In the 1980s Stanley Menzo was subjected to racist abuse from fans.

In a 1991 interview, Heerenveen manager Fritz Korbach racially abused two black players, calling Bryan Roy "a short fucking negro" and Romário "that coffee bean of PSV"). Furtherly, Korbach also insulted Simon Tahamata, who was of Moluccan descent, calling him a "train hijacker". During UEFA Euro 1996, the Afro-Surinamese Dutch player Edgar Davids was sent home after publicly alleging discrimination within the team's organization.

In 2004, a Dutch match between ADO Den Haag and PSV was abandoned after 80 minutes due to racist chanting from some members of the crowd.

In November 2006, Kenneth Perez received a five-game ban for shouting 'kankerneger', ('cancerous negro') at black linesman Nicky Siebert.

In November 2011, Guyon Fernandez received a six-game ban for hitting opposition player Rens van Eijden. Fernandez claimed he was reacting to racist abuse from Van Eijden.

During the 2012–13 KNVB Cup quarter-final match between FC Den Bosch and AZ Alkmaar, American AZ Alkmaar forward Jozy Altidore was the target of racist chants. Den Bosch's director, Peter Bijvelds, blamed "malicious supporters making a scandalous mess of the evening". He said Den Bosch, AZ and the referee considered abandoning the match, but decided against it.

In November 2019 Ahmad Mendes Moreira was subjected to racism from opposition FC Den Bosch fans. Den Bosch initially tried to claim the sounds were crows, but later apologised for the claim. A few days later, Dutch international Georginio Wijnaldum celebrated an international goal by gesturing at his skin colour in support of Mendes Moreira, and later that month it was announced that players in the Dutch top two divisions would not play for the 1st minute of the next weekend's games in protest at racism.

Norway

In one case, young player Caleb Francis was severely abused in his debut match for Kongsvinger IL. The abuse halted and nearly broke his career, but he returned to Kongsvinger's senior team after two years, and had a long career.

Several other players have experienced racism, often while playing national or club matches abroad. These players include Daniel Braaten and Pa Modou Kah.

Top-tier club Vålerenga Fotball famously played their with the slogan "Vålerenga Against Racism" instead of a shirt sponsor in the 1997 season. An official campaign, initiated by the footballers' trade union, is called "Give Racism the Red Card".

Poland

According to The Stephen Roth Institute for the Study of Contemporary Antisemitism and Racism, football stadiums in Poland are a recruiting ground for extremist organisations. , neo-fascist symbols were a common sight there.

During the Extraordinary Congress of the International Football Federation (FIFA), held in Buenos Aires from 6–7 July 2001, the problem of racism in Polish football was discussed and Polish national football association was called to join the struggle against racism. The problem of anti-Semitism in Polish football has drawn international criticism. Poland was named as one of the worst offenders, in British Member of Parliament John Mann report, which describes anti-Semitic incidents in 18 countries across Europe. It was noted that Polish fans routinely call each other "Jews" as a term of abuse. In April 2008, ŁKS Łódź player Arkadiusz Mysona wore a shirt which said "Śmierć żydzewskiej kurwie" ("Death to Widzew-Jewish Whore", which is word play used by the LKS Łódź supporters, who call fans of their local rivals "Jews") after a match in the Polish Ekstraklasa. Mysona said afterwards that the shirt was given to him by a fan and he had not checked it.

In 2003, the Polish anti-racist "Never Again" Association organized a tournament with the slogan "Let's Kick Racism out of the Stadiums", imploring the Polish Football Association to act against racism in the sport. In 2012, ahead of UEFA Euro 2012, the Polish anti-racist "Never Again" Association launched one of the most extensive anti-racist campaigns in football, as a long-standing partner of the Fare network. The BBC Panorama program toured football matches in Poland before UEFA Euro 2012, jointly held in Poland and Ukraine. The journalists recorded "a chorus of anti-Semitic chanting" and witnessed "black football players enduring monkey chants from the terraces".

Portugal

In 2015, Portuguese international player Renato Sanches suffered monkey chants from Rio Ave supporters while leaving the pitch in a match of Rio Ave against Benfica. However, the player jokingly responded to the chants by clapping and making a monkey pose.

On 16 February 2020, Porto footballer Moussa Marega left the pitch after he was subjected to racists insults in a 2-1 victory over Vitoria Guimaraes.

Republic of Ireland
Cyrus Christie revealed that he was subjected to racist abuse whilst on international duty with Republic of Ireland outside the training ground when he first joined up, and also revealed that he was receiving racist abuse after games.

Romania

The publicized display of portraits of Romania's World War II leader and convicted war criminal Ion Antonescu and racist slogans by football hooligans during Liga I's 2005–2006 season prompted UEFA intervention (see Racism Breaks the Game).

On 15 November 2019, Swedish player Alexander Isak suffered allegedly racist abuse from Romanian fans during a match between the two countries. The match was initially halted, but continued after Isak and the referee consulted on the matter. UEFA investigated and found there had been no racism.

Russia

Cameroonian player André Bikey suffered racist abuse while playing for Lokomotiv Moscow.

Brazilian footballer Antonio Geder of Saturn Moscow was received with monkey chants at Petrovsky Stadium in a match against Zenit Saint Petersburg.

In March 2008, black players of French side Marseille, including André Ayew, Ronald Zubar and Charles Kaboré, were targeted by fans of Zenit Saint Petersburg; Zenit fans were later warned by police in Manchester not to repeat their behaviour ahead of the 2008 UEFA Cup Final. Later on, Zenit coach Dick Advocaat revealed the club's supporters were racist. When they attempted to sign Mathieu Valbuena, a Frenchman, many fans asked "Is he a negro?" Additionally, Serge Branco, who played for Krylia Sovetov Samara, accused Zenit's staff of racism: "Each time I play in St Petersburg I have to listen to racist insults from the stands. Zenit bosses do not do anything about it which makes me think they are racists too."

On 20 August 2010, Peter Odemwingie, a Russian-born Nigerian international, joined English Premier League team West Bromwich Albion. Shortly after signing, photographs showed Lokomotiv Moscow fans celebrating the sale of Odemwingie through the use of racist banners targeted at the player. One banner included the image of a banana and read "Thanks West Brom".

On 12 February 2011, Roberto Carlos signed a contract with Russian Premier League club Anzhi Makhachkala. In March, during a game away at Zenit Saint Petersburg, a banana was held near the player by one of the fans as the footballer was taking part in a flag-raising ceremony. In June, in a match away at Krylia Sovetov Samara, Roberto Carlos received a pass from the goalkeeper and was about to pass it when a banana was thrown onto the pitch, landing nearby. The 38-year-old Brazilian picked it up and threw it by the sidelines, walking off the field before the final whistle and raising two fingers at the stands, indicating this was the second such incident since March.

In December 2012, Zenit fans published a manifesto demanding that the club exclude all non-white and homosexual players from the club's roster. The demands were refused by the club, which released a statement saying that "the team's policy is aimed at development and integration into the world soccer community, and holds no archaic views". Until the summer of 2012, Zenit was the only team in the Russian top flight never to have signed a minority player.

In October 2013, Manchester City midfielder Yaya Touré received racist abuse from opposition fans whilst playing against CSKA Moscow in Russia. The club's stadium was partially closed as punishment. Touré suggested that black players might boycott the 2018 FIFA World Cup, to be held in Russia, if racism continued in the country.

In September 2014, Dynamo Moscow defender Christopher Samba was racially abused playing in the Moscow derby against Torpedo Moscow. As a result, Torpedo were forced to close part of their stadium, although Samba was also banned for two games for swearing at the racist fans.

In a friendly match between Russia and France in Saint Petersburg on 17 April 2018, monkey chants were directed at members of the French team. The noises were picked up by television cameras and reported by photographers at the side of the pitch. As a result, "disciplinary actions have been opened against the Russian Football Union (RFU) for this incident", a FIFA statement read.

In March 2019 Pavel Pogrebnyak was accused of racism after saying it was "laughable" for black players to represent the Russian national team.

Serbia

In October 2006, 37 Borac Čačak fans were arrested and eight faced criminal charges after racially abusing the club's Zimbabwean player Mike Temwanjera during a first division match. Borac Čačak was at the centre of more controversy in March 2008 when a Ghanaian player, Solomon Opoku, was attacked by fans; six fans were later arrested, with four being later charged.

On 29 November 2006, Hajduk Kula coach Nebojša Vučićević racially insulted Red Star Belgrade's Senegalese defender Ibrahima Gueye. The coach responded to the accusation: "I told my players several times to put pressure on the black guy, I don't see anything wrong with that."

During a match against England's under-21 side, an unnamed Serbian under-21 player was accused of racially abusing the black English defender Justin Hoyte, while the Serbian fans were alleged to have racially abused England's Nigerian-born full-back Nedum Onuoha.

Following racist abuse from Montenegrin club Zeta fans, DaMarcus Beasley, during his stint with Scottish side Rangers, recalled previous instances of racism whilst playing away in Belgrade from fans of Red Star. Red Star, however, has been defended by some of its black players, such as Segundo Castillo and Franklin Salas, with Castillo saying that, "Red Star fans are not racist." Rangers boss Walter Smith stated he had not heard the abuse, having been absorbed in the game.

In 2017, a group of fans at a game between FK Rad and Partizan Belgrade held up a racist banner and directed monkey sounds towards Everton Luiz, a Brazilian player. Efforts to stop the taunts failed and the opposing team joined in the racist actions, leaving Luiz in tears.

In November 2019 Partizan Belgrade manager Savo Milosevic said there was no racism problem in Serbia after his team were punished for racist actions by fans.

On 18 February 2021, AC Milan forward Zlatan Ibrahimovic was subjected to racist abuse by an individual seated in the VIP box during a Europa League match against Red Star Belgrade.

Slovakia

On 4 April 2007, football supporters from Slovan Bratislava displayed a banner which contained the words "Alles Gute Adi" and a smiley-head face of Adolf Hitler during a match against Senec; racist chants were also heard. Three days later, on 7 April, Slovan Bratislava fans were responsible for directing monkey chants at Artmedia Bratislava's Karim Guédé.

Spain

In the 1992-93 La Liga season, the late Rayo Vallecano goalkeeper Wilfred Agbonavbare was target of racist abuse from Real Madrid fans, such as chants as Negro, cabrón, recoge el algodón! ("Nigger, motherfucker, go to pick some cotton!") and  a middle-aged man from Madrid saying on live TV that "that fucking nigger from Rayo" and the referee Juan Andújar Oliver were to blame for Real Madrid's defeat, much to the amusement of the teenage fans who shouted "Ku Klux Klan",. In the same live TV report, a 13-year old Real Madrid fan took furiously the microphone and spat, making a verbal threat to the Nigerian goalkeeper saying "Sunday we'll go to beat to death the nigger, that son of a bitch, in Vallecas". When asked about the abuse suffered, Wilfred stated "That's normal, I am dark-skinned and having made many saves, I expected people to shout at me. But i am a footballer and this is nothing, i am very focused on [playing] my match". The Bukaneros, a far-left ultras group from Rayo Vallecano, dedicated to Wilfred a graffiti with the dedication "For your defense of the Sash against racism, we will not forget you".

Since 1996, after his transfer from Real Madrid to FC Barcelona, many supporter groups of Barcelona's rivals (Ultras Sur being the first) abused Luis Enrique by chanting "Luis Enrique, tu padre es Amunike" (Luis Enrique, your father is Amunike), which referenced the Nigerian striker, who then, was his teammate for the culés. The abuse still carried on such as in 2016, when a man abused Luis Enrique - now as Barcelona's coach- with said chant when the latter was getting out from the bus at El Prat airport a day before the 2016-17 Champions League fourth group stage match against Manchester City F.C.

Aston Villa's Dalian Atkinson returned from Spain after one season with Real Sociedad, unhappy with the reception he received and identifying racial abuse as a major factor in his rapid departure from the Spanish club.

Ivorian midfielder Félix Dja Ettien suffered racial abuse when he first signed for Levante (where he stayed from 1997 to 2008); he was ignored by the coach due to his inability to speak Spanish and whenever he fell ill, he was accused of having malaria or AIDS.

During a training session in 2004, a Spanish TV crew filmed Spain national team head coach Luis Aragonés trying to motivate José Antonio Reyes by making offensive and racist references to Reyes' then-teammate at Arsenal, Thierry Henry. The phrase used was "Demuestra que eres mejor que ese negro de mierda", translated as "Show that you're better than that fucking black guy". The incident caused uproar in the British media, with calls for Aragonés to be sacked. When Spain played England in a friendly match at the Santiago Bernabéu Stadium soon after, on 17 November 2004, the atmosphere was hostile. Whenever black England players touched the ball, a significant proportion of the Spanish crowd began to make monkey chants, in particular to Shaun Wright-Phillips and Ashley Cole. Additionally, when England sang their national anthem before kick-off, Spanish fans also racially chanted English players. Aragonés' remarks were widely blamed by the British press for inciting the incident. After an investigation into the events during the match, UEFA fined the Royal Spanish Football Federation 100,000 CHF (US$87,000) and warned that any future incidents would be punished more severely. The incident even drew reactions from then-Prime Minister of the United Kingdom Tony Blair and Sports Minister Richard Caborn, with the latter making the claim that the behaviour of Spanish fans was 20 or 30 years behind that of their British counterparts. UEFA noted that possible punishments could include suspension from major international tournaments or the closure of Spain home international matches to supporters. On 7 February 2007, Aragonés won an appeal over the offence, with the misdemeanour being downgraded to "conduct which could be considered to be racist".

In February 2005, Samuel Eto'o received racially driven verbal abuse from some Real Zaragoza spectators during a match for Barcelona. The fans began making monkey-like chants whenever Eto'o had possession of the ball and peanuts were hurled onto the pitch. Eto'o threatened to leave the pitch in the middle of the game, but was prevented by the intervention of his teammates and the referee, who rushed to the pitch to calm him down. His black teammate Ronaldinho, who has suffered similar abuses but less intensely, said he was fed-up with the sounds and that if Eto'o had left the pitch, he would have done the same. As Barcelona won 4–1, Eto'o danced like a monkey, saying rival fans were treating him as a monkey. Referee Fernando Carmona Méndez did not mention the incidents in his match report, commenting only that the behaviour of the crowd was "normal". The fans were identified to police by fellow spectators and they were fined and banned from attending sporting events for five months. Eto'o declared in the aftermath that the punishment was insufficient and that La Romareda, Real Zaragoza's stadium, should have been closed for at least one year. However, Eto'o's coach, Frank Rijkaard, told him to concentrate on football and to stop talking about the incident. Eto'o has stated that he does not take his children to football matches due to the prevalent racism and has also suggested that players walk off if they become victims of racism.

Many other African footballers have also been victims of racial abuse, such as the Cameroonian Carlos Kameni, who was abused while playing for Espanyol against Atlético Madrid, who were fined €6,000.

In January 2009, the Royal Spanish Football Federation fined Real Madrid approximately US$3,900 after a group of fans made fascist gestures and chanted fascist slogans at a match. Match referee Alfonso Pérez Burrull cited "extremist or radical symbolism", and chants making reference to "the gas chamber."

On 27 April 2014, Barcelona player Dani Alves was targeted by Villarreal fans, who threw a banana at him. Alves picked up the banana, peeled it, and took a bite. Teammate and also Brazilian player Neymar's response, to post a photograph of himself on social media also eating a banana, went viral. Other footballers have also since taken photographs of themselves eating bananas. Cyrille Regis, who had been racially abused while a player in the 1970s and '80s, expressed concern that the viral campaign would detract from the important issues of combating racism in the game. Alves said that whoever threw the banana at him should be publicly shamed, and on 30 April 2014, a man was arrested in connection with the incident. Villarreal were later fined €12,000 for the incident.

In early May 2014, Levante's Papakouli Diop complained of receiving racist abuse from opposition Atlético Madrid fans.

Espanyol banned 12 supporters after they were identified as having subjected Atletico Bilbao player Iñaki Williams to racist abuse in a match in January 2020.

On 4 April 2021, the players of Valencia left the pitch during a La Liga game against Cádiz after their player, Mouctar Diakhaby, was allegedly subjected to racist abuse.

In September 2022, Real Madrid player Vinicius Jr was criticised on television for dancing whilst celebrating a goal; the player said that criticism, which compared him to a "monkey", was racist. Following this, some fans of Atletico Madrid were accused of singing racist songs about Vinicius, which was condemned by La Liga. Vinicius Jr later said that La Liga did not do anything about racists, a few days after which La Liga announced that they had filed charges against those accused. In February 2023 it was revealed that nobody in Spain "has been sentenced or punished for a racist incident related to football".

Sweden

In 2009, fans of Swedish football team IFK Göteborg abused supporters of rivals Malmö FF by referring to them as "Rosengårdstattare" ("Rosengård gypsies"), in a racist reference to the large immigrant population of Malmö. Also, fans of Helsingborgs IF have been known to yell monkey chants at opposing dark-skinned players.

In the summer of 2018, the Swedish National Team posted a Youtube video of player Jimmy Durmaz making a statement against racism in football. Durmaz stated that online he has been called "darkie, bloody Arab, terrorist, Taliban." In the video, Durmaz talks about his family and how they have also been targets of racism. At the end, Durmaz says "vi är eniga, vi är sverige, knulla rasism”, which translates to "We are United, We are Sweden, F**k Racism".

Switzerland

Fwayo Tembo left Basel after he accused club coach Thorsten Fink of making racist remarks towards him during a training session. Fink is reported to have told a collaborator to "get the monkey down from the tree".

Turkey

On 15 April 2012, Fenerbahçe's Emre Belözoğlu was accused of making racist comments on the pitch towards Trabzonspor's Didier Zokora. After the match, Zokora told Lig TV:

Lip-reading professionals say Belözoğlu has said the words "fucking nigger". Emre received a two-game ban for his actions after it was concluded that he had used abusive, but not racist, language by the authorities. There are still questions about the low ban he received.

On 12 May 2013, before the match between Fenerbahçe and Galatasaray, Galatasaray striker Didier Drogba, along with his Ivorian international teammate Emmanuel Eboué, were racially abused by certain Fenerbahçe fans during the pre-match warmups. They were allegedly shown bananas. Television cameras and some pictures clearly captured a fan waving around a banana, other fans had black trash bags on their heads and were pictured holding the brand of the beverage "Negro". Though there were no monkey chants or gestures of that sort, the "banana" caused a huge controversy and Fenerbahce has been condemned. This was the second ever known racism incident in Turkey, again involving Fenerbahçe following the events that took place between Belözoğlu and Zokora in 2012.

United Kingdom

England

The Commission for Racial Equality (CRE), the Football Supporters Association (FSA) and the Professional Footballers' Association (PFA) have all launched initiatives in a bid to encourage more people from ethnic minorities to attend matches. In October 2019, Premier League also launched a No Room For Racism initiative, which was visible in all the matches played from 19 to 27 October. Prior to the 2022–23 Premier League, the captains announced to end the practice of taking a knee before matches. However, reaffirming their commitment to stand against racism, they decided to take a knee only on certain selected “significant moments”.

Timeline
Arthur Wharton, born in Gold Coast (today's Ghana), was the world's first black professional footballer. He played as a goalkeeper for Darlington. Wharton was considered the first black professional footballer although he was pre-dated by Andrew Watson, a Scottish amateur footballer. Other early non-white footballers include Walter Tull and Hong Y Soo.

Dark-skinned Everton centre-forward Dixie Dean recalled how racist comments were aimed at him as he left the pitch at half time during a match in London in the 1930s. Dean reportedly punched the offender before disappearing into the players' tunnel. The authorities took no action against Dean, and a nearby police officer was alleged to have informed the victim that he had "deserved" his punishment.

Steve Mokone, a black South African who later was signed for, but never played for Barcelona, left Coventry City after his manager allegedly said to him, "We brought you over here and you are not satisfied. That's the trouble with you people"; Mokone interpreted this as being racist, and he swiftly signed for Dutch side Heracles Almelo.

The player Roger Verdi, who is of Indian origin, changed his name from Rajinder Singh Virdee due to racism.

In the 1960s, West Ham United players Clyde Best, who is black and from Bermuda, and Ade Coker were subjected to "monkey chants" and had bananas thrown at them during West Ham's games. Best had blamed this on the influence of the National Front on the football terraces.

In the 1980s, racism in football in England was rampant. Paul Canoville was abused by his own fans when he warmed up for Chelsea before making his debut. Garth Crooks was regularly subject to racist chants and banners from opposing fans during his time at Spurs. Cyrille Regis endured monkey chants from Newcastle United fans on his away debut for West Bromwich Albion and was later sent a bullet in the mail following his call-up to the England squad. In 1987 John Barnes was pictured back-heeling a banana off the pitch during a match for Liverpool against Everton, whose fans chanted "Everton are white".

Aston Villa striker Stan Collymore accused Liverpool defender Steve Harkness of racist abuse during a match at Villa Park in April 1998. In response, Harkness stated: "I vehemently deny the accusation that I made racist comments to Stan Collymore."

On 21 April 2004, Ron Atkinson resigned from ITV after he was caught making a racist remark live on air about the black Chelsea player Marcel Desailly; believing the microphone to be switched off, he said, "...he [Desailly] is what is known in some schools as a fucking lazy thick nigger." Although transmission in the UK had finished, the microphone gaffe meant that his comment was broadcast to various countries in the Middle East. He also left his job as a columnist for The Guardian "by mutual agreement" as a result of the comment.

In 2004, Millwall became the first club to be charged by The Football Association over racist behaviour by their fans. The charges related to abuse aimed at Liverpool player Djimi Traoré.
On 13 January 2007, The FA charged Newcastle player Emre Belözoğlu with "using racially-aggravated abusive and/or insulting words", referring to an incident during the 3–0 defeat by Everton at Goodison Park on 30 December 2006. Belözoğlu was, on 16 February 2007, accused of more racist behaviour, this time against Bolton Wanderers' El Hadji Diouf. However, on 1 March 2007, it was revealed that Diouf would not be pursuing his claim. It was also later revealed that Watford player Al Bangura had released a statement declaring that he was the victim of racist abuse from Belözoğlu. On 19 March he was cleared of the charges relating to the Everton game.

In 2004, during a friendly match with Spain, English fans chanted racist comments towards the Spanish team and fans. This incident was widely condemned by the British government. This incident, although not a new manifestation, brought greater awareness in England to the problem of racism in sports.

On 6 March 2007, it was announced that the Metropolitan Police were investigating apparent anti-Semitic chants by West Ham fans before the match with Tottenham Hotspur two days previously after a video of the offence surfaced on the Internet.

On 7 April 2007, in a match between Rotherham United and Gillingham, Gillingham keeper Kelvin Jack was racially abused by a Rotherham fan. On 13 April 2007, the fan was banned for life from the club.

Following his appointment as manager in September 2007, Israeli Avram Grant has been the subject of anti-Semitic taunts from some Chelsea fans; Grant's father was a Polish survivor of the German Nazi Holocaust; Grant has also received death threats and anti-Semitic post.

In November 2008, Middlesbrough's Egyptian forward Mido was subjected to Islamophobic chanting from a small number of Newcastle fans. Mido had been subjected to similar chants the previous year, again from Newcastle fans, and also in 2007 by Southampton fans and West Ham fans who had referred to Mido as a "shoe bomber" in reference to his likeness to Richard Reid, the British terrorist jailed in 2003.

During a League Cup match between Blackpool and Stoke City at the Britannia Stadium on 22 September 2009, Blackpool player Jason Euell, who at the time was sat on the substitutes bench was racially abused by a Stoke fan, who was ejected from the stadium and subsequently arrested by Staffordshire Police before being released pending inquiries. Euell confronted the supporter that was taunting him. Blackpool manager Ian Holloway, who had to restrain Euell, was furious in his post-match interview, saying:
We are human beings and Jason is a footballer. The colour of his skin shouldn't matter. It was disgusting. The stewards believed what Jason said, got the bloke out and I hope he is banned for life. [He is] an absolute disgrace of a human being. I thought those days had gone. Jason was just sat in the dugout at the time. I saw his reaction and I had to calm him down. It's absolutely disgraceful.
Euell, who received an official apology from Stoke City, later said:
It did hurt. I felt I had to stand up for all colours and creeds and show that we won't accept it. I'm proud that I made a stand. It was a shock to hear what came out of the guy's mouth. Racism in football is not dead and buried but it's still a shock to hear that kind of thing in close proximity. There were people near the idiot who didn't agree with it, but there were others who turned a blind eye, which was disappointing.
In the wake of the incident, Spurs manager Harry Redknapp called for fans who racially abuse players to be imprisoned: "That is disgusting – there's no place for that in the game. Surely we can't have that sort of behaviour now? Anyone who does it should be put in prison – not banned from football. Stick them where they belong, in the nut-house. It's wrong."

In April 2011, an initiative was launched by comedian David Baddiel to tackle anti-semitism in the sport, which was backed by players including Frank Lampard, Ledley King and Kieran Gibbs. The same month, two followers of Chesterfield were arrested before the start of a game against Torquay United after racially abusing a young black Torquay player who was taking part in the pre-match entertainment. Offenders Trevor Laughton and Joanne Worrall were subsequently banned from watching football or from approaching the venue of any Chesterfield matches for three years.

On 15 October 2011, Liverpool's Luis Suárez was accused of racially abusing Manchester United's Patrice Evra, and The FA opened up an investigation into the incident. On 16 November, The FA announced they would be charging Suárez, while Liverpool announced support for their player. On 20 December, The FA concluded a seven-day hearing, eventually fining Suárez £40,000 and banning him for eight matches for racially abusing Evra. Suárez had used the word "negrito" towards Evra, meaning "little black man" in Spanish. Suárez claimed that he meant the term to be taken as it is purportedly used in South America, as a term of endearment, but this explanation was not accepted by The FA. The day after Suárez was found guilty, his Liverpool teammates wore t-shirts in support of him. In October 2019 Jamie Carragher apologised for this.

On 23 October 2011, in a match between Queens Park Rangers and Chelsea, QPR's Anton Ferdinand alleged racial abuse by Chelsea captain John Terry, claiming Terry called him a "fucking black cunt" during the game, a claim denied by Terry. On 1 November, the Metropolitan Police announced a formal investigation into the allegations. In January 2012, Ferdinand received death threats and a bullet was sent to him through the post. On 1 February 2012 at Westminster Magistrates Court, Terry was accused of a racially aggravated public order offence in relation to the game at Loftus Road on 23 October. He entered a not-guilty plea and stood trial on 9 July. On 13 July, after a four-day trial, Terry was acquitted. In July, following the court hearing, Terry was charged by The FA with "using abusive and/or insulting words and/or behaviour towards Ferdinand and which included a reference to colour and/or race contrary to FA Rule E3[2]". In September 2012, after a four-day hearing, he was found guilty, banned for four games and fined £220,000.
Evidence in his defence at Terry's trial had been given by his teammate Ashley Cole. Ferdinand's brother Rio later referred to Cole via Twitter as a "choc ice", meaning someone who is black on the outside but white on the inside. In August 2012, The FA found this to be a reference to ethnic origin, colour or race and fined Ferdinand £45,000.

On 29 May 2012, the BBC reported that Swindon Town had conceded, in a response to a solicitor's letter from Jonathan Tehoue, that manager Paolo Di Canio, a self-described fascist, had made an inappropriate remark to the player which Tehoue deemed to be racist. Before this news had broken, Swindon's chairman had been quoted as being entirely supportive of Di Canio and had denied that the manager had racially insulted Tehoue. In October 2013, six supporters of Charlton Athletic were sent to prison having been found guilty of racially aggravated fear of violence. The supporters had been on a train returning from a game against Fulham singing songs glorifying Gary Dobson, the racially motivated murderer of Stephen Lawrence.

In March 2014, Wolverhampton Wanderers players Carl Ikeme and George Elokobi stated they were racially abused by opposition fans while playing away at Walsall. No action was taken against the club.

In August 2014, Malky Mackay and Iain Moody were accused of sending each other racist, sexist and homophobic text messages. Moody left his job as sporting director of Crystal Palace as a result. Mackay apologised for the texts. The League Manager's Association defended Mackay, claiming that the texts were merely "banter"; the LMA had to later apologise for this as well. Mackay later denied being racist, sexist or homophobic.
In September 2014, Liverpool player Mario Balotelli was subjected to racist abuse on Twitter following his tweet mocking Manchester United. Balotelli had tweeted "Man Utd... LOL'", following their 5–3 defeat to Leicester City. Also in September 2014, Port Vale chairman Norman Smurthwaite considered appointing Jimmy Floyd Hasselbaink as manager, but decided against it partly because he believed that a racist minority of the club's supporters would make appointing a black manager a poor idea.

In February 2015, Chelsea fans were involved in an incident in which they pushed a black passenger off a Métro carriage at Richelieu-Drouot station in Paris before a Champions League match against Paris Saint-Germain. The supporters were heard chanting: "We're racist, we're racist, and that's the way we like it." Afterwards, Chelsea released a statement condemning the actions, and vowed to ban those involved. The incident prompted criticism from the football world. The FA condemned the incident, and backed Chelsea to take action. UEFA said they were "appalled" by the incident. FIFA President Sepp Blatter tweeted "there is no place for racism in football". Chelsea later suspended three people from attending Chelsea games pending further investigation.

In December 2017, at Prenton Park in an UEFA Youth League, Liverpool's Rhian Brewster was racially abused during the game.

Fernando Forestieri was accused of racially abusing opposition player Krystian Pearce in a pre-season friendly. He was charged by police, and on 28 December 2018, an arrest warrant was issued after Forestieri failed to attend court. He was found not guilty by a court in March 2019, but was charged with racial abuse by the Football Association. The FA found him guilty and issued a six-game ban, which he said he intended to appeal.

A North West Counties League game between Congleton Town and Padiham in October 2018 was abandoned in the second-half by the referee after the Padiham goalkeeper received racial abuse.

In October 2018 Wilfried Zaha was the victim of racist abuse and death threats following a match. In December 2018, a Tottenham Hotspur supporter was fined £500 and banned for four years for throwing a banana skin at Pierre-Emerick Aubameyang during Arsenal's 4-2 victory in the North London derby in which Aubameyang scored twice.

In January 2019, Crystal Palace goalkeeper, Wayne Hennessey, denied making a Nazi salute after a picture of him was posted on Instagram by a Max Meyer, a teammate of his. The picture was taken after Palace won their third round FA Cup tie against Grimsby Town. In the picture, Hennessey has one arm raised while the other is over his mouth, much like that of the Nazi salute. However, Hennessey has claimed that he, "waved and shouted at the person taking the picture to get on with it" and "put my hand over my mouth to make the sound carry". Hennessey won’t receive any official punishment for the incident as the FA’s regulatory commission has stated, "when cross-examined about this Mr Hennessey displayed a very considerable – one might say even lamentable – degree of ignorance about anything to do with Hitler, fascism and the Nazi regime". Although he has come under fire from Kick It Out, which is English football’s equality and inclusion organization, and they have stated in a tweet by their official account, "If Wayne Hennessey doesn’t know what a Nazi salute is, or understand its horrifying wider implications, then it’s vital that he receives appropriate education as a consequence".

In January 2019, women's player Renée Hector said that an opponent had made monkey noises towards her during a match. In February 2019, Sophie Jones was charged by the Football Association with racially abusing Hector. In March 2019, Jones was found guilty and banned for five matches.

In February 2019 West Ham United said they were investigating a video which allegedly showed fans racially abusing Mohamed Salah, including for being Muslim. The club then referred the matter to the police. Later that month Kick It Out chairman Lord Ouseley said the authorities were "dysfunctional" in dealing with racism in football, whilst player Michail Antonio suggested that clubs whose fans engage in racial abuse should be deducted points.

In February 2019 Millwall were charged by the Football Association over alleged racist chanting by their fans during a FA Cup game against Everton in January. Leeds United were also investigated for alleged racism of their fans. The same month, two Burnley fans were accused of using racist slurs against Brighton player Gaetan Bong and homophobic slurs against Brighton fans. Their criminal trial collapsed in October 2019.

In March 2019, Philip Billing suffered racial abuse on social media; the matter was reported to police. In April 2019, a number of players were subjected to racist abuse on social media, including Charlton Athletic players Lyle Taylor, Wigan Athletic player Nathan Byrne, and Watford players Troy Deeney, Adrian Mariappa and Christian Kabasele. Later that month, Chuks Aneke was the subject of a racist meme, and Manchester United captain Ashley Young was also racially abused on social media.

Later that month, an amateur cup final in Leicestershire was abandoned due to racist abuse, with the victim being subjected to a six-match ban, whilst Danny Rose said he was looking forward to ending his football career due to racism. Later that month he said he hoped governing bodies would take more action to eradicate racism in football. That same month Chelsea chairman Bruce Buck said the solution to the issue was education, whilst Raheem Sterling said walking off the pitch in response to racism was not ideal.

In April 2019, Kalidou Koulibaly was the victim of racist abuse from an apparent Arsenal fan during a match between the two teams. The same month, former player Jamie Lawrence spoke out against racism in football, revealing that during his playing career he had been racially abused by one of his own teammates.

In April 2019, The Guardian released a "special investigation into the racism crisis [in English football]" which "uncover[ed] anger, despair and a warning that there will be 'an explosion' unless the problem is tackled".

Later that month, British Asian footballers spoke out about the racist abuse they had encountered, and the following month the vice chair of the Black, Asian and Minority Ethnic Football Forum said that child players as young as seven years old were regularly the subject of racial slurs from not only spectators, but also from opposing players, coaches and managers. In May 2019, Emile Heskey's wife said there were insufficient opportunities for black players to become coaches. Raheem Sterling also Called for tougher punishments.

In June 2019, the English Football League introduced a rule compared to the Rooney Rule.

In July 2019, Kick It Out reported that reports of racist abuse rose by 43% during the 2018–19 football season. Later that month Chelsea issued a lifetime ban against a fan who had racially abused Raheem Sterling in December 2018. On 31 July 2019 the FA increased the minimum ban for racism to six games.

In August 2019, Fulham player Cyrus Christie accused a Fulham fan of assaulting his sister and the fan's wife of using racist language at the club's opening game of the season, a 1–0 loss at Barnsley. Later that month, the FA was told it had to modernise. In the following days, Chelsea Forward Tammy Abraham faced racist abuse over social media, after missing the decisive spot kick against Liverpool in the Uefa Super Cup. The actions were later condemned by Chelsea club spokesperson who said: "We are disgusted with the abhorrent posts we have seen on social media".

On 6 August 2019, Liverpool player Mohamed Salah was subjected to racist comments on social media by an Everton fan, who was arrested by police and later sentenced to six weeks in jail.

In August 2019, Yakou Méïté spoke out about racist abuse he received on social media. He said he chose to do so due to the impact it had on players.

Later that month, Paul Pogba suffered racist abuse on social media after missing a penalty during match on 19 August 2019. The abuse was condemned by players including Ryan Giggs, and Twitter announced they would meet with Pogba's club Manchester United and the Kick it Out organisation, after Phil Neville called for a social media boycott in protest. Pogba's Manchester United teammate Marcus Rashford was also racially abused on social media, and ex-footballer Garth Crooks said that unless something would do there could be an incident between a player and a fan, similar to Eric Cantona's kung-fu kick on an opposition fan in 1995.

In August 2019, Yan Dhanda said that the racism he has encountered as a British Asian footballer inspires him to play his best.

In September 2019, the Black, Asian and Minority Ethnic Football Forum released a report which said that child players were being racially abused.

In September 2019, Jadon Sancho spoke out against racism in football. On 7 September, Raheem Sterling was racially abused by a spectator at England's Euro 2020 qualifier against Bulgaria at Wembley; the spectator was removed from the stadium and later taken to a north London police station on suspicion of public order offence. However, he was released with no further action.

In September 2019, Tammy Abraham said his mother had cried after he had been subjected to racist abuse in a match.

The same month, Stevenage manager Mark Sampson was accused of using racist language by a former coach at the club. The club denied the accusations, while the FA said they would investigate. On 20 November 2019 Sampson was charged by the FA for using racist language.

Later that month the Home Office said that hate crime incidents at football matches increased by 47% during the 2018–19 season from the previous season.

In September 2019, Peter Beardsley was suspended from football for all football-related activity for 32 weeks after being found guilty by the FA of racially abusing players. Later that month, in a match between Hartlepool United and Dover Athletic, both teams' managers said they considered taking their players off the pitch following racist abuse from Hartlepool fans aimed at Dover player Inih Effiong. Dover said they wanted action taken. Hartlepool were charged by the FA in October 2019.

A few days later Bernardo Silva was accused of being racist about Manchester City teammate Benjamin Mendy following a tweet; the FA wrote to Manchester City for its comments. Manchester City's manager Pep Guardiola said punishing Silva for his comments would be a "mistake", and Silva was defended by teammate Raheem Sterling. In October 2019 Silva was charged by the FA. He had 7 days to respond, but was given an extension. In November 2019 he was banned for one match and fined £50,000.

In September 2019, Leeds goalkeeper Kiko Casilla was accused of racially abusing Charlton forward Jonathan Leko in a match between the two teams; the FA said they would investigate. In November 2019 he denied the charge. He was later found guilty, and banned for eight matches and fined £60,000.

In October 2019, three fans of Brighton & Hove Albion were investigated in relation to two separate incidents at their stadium. The same month, a video purportedly showing racist chants from Aston Villa fans about players Marvelous Nakamba and John McGinn surfaced, and was condemned by the club. Later that month Wilfried Zaha was sent racial abuse on social media after missing a penalty in a match.

Later that month the Premier League launched a black and ethnic minority advisory group.

On 19 October 2019, an FA Cup qualifying match between Haringey Borough and Yeovil Town was abandoned after Yeovil fans reportedly racially abused Haringey's goalkeeper Valery Pajetat, including spitting and throwing a bottle at him. Haringey's defender Coby Rowe was also targeted. Both sets of players walked off the pitch. Two men were later arrested. It was later announced that the match would be replayed, with the replayed match ending in a 3–0 victory to Yeovil on 29 October 2019. The next day police announced they were hunting for 3 people in relation to the previous racist abuse.

On the same day as the Haringey-Yeovil incident, Bristol City fans were accused of racist abuse against Luton Town players. There were further racist incidents in the following days, with anti-traveller chants coming from Salford fans at Northampton Town, and a Liverpool player being racially abused at Manchester United. Later that month three Chelsea fans were banned by the club after racially abusing a fellow fan. Liverpool fans were criticised by the club for displaying a racist banner about their own player Divock Origi.

Later that month QPR also criticised FIFA and UEFA for their response to racist abuse of youth players.

In November 2019, there was an alleged racist behaviour of Everton fans during Premier League match between Everton and Tottenham Hotspur was reported. Later that day, Everton said that they were investigating the claims. Police said they would take no action.

In November 2019, Watford captain Troy Deeney said there should be a one-strike policy towards racism. Later that month, Sanjay Bhandari, the new chairman of anti-racism charity Kick It Out, said the problem of racism in football might get worse before it got better.

Later that month, the Home Office announced that there had been a 66% increase in hate crime in English football from the previous year, the majority related to racism. Later that month, Hayes & Yeading said that their player Elliott Buchanan has been subject to racist abuse from a fan whilst playing Salisbury, with Salisbury reporting the matter to police.

On 7 December 2019, Manchester United player Fred was allegedly racially abused by Manchester City fans during the Manchester derby, while Scunthorpe United player Jordan Clarke was also allegedly abused by Forest Green Rovers fans that same day. Ex-player Gary Neville later blamed Prime Minister Boris Johnson for the rise in racism in English football. A man was later arrested for the incident involving Fred. Police investigated an incident of racial abuse by a fan of Millwall towards a Barnsley player following Millwall’s 2-1 home defeat on 21 December 2019.

On 22 December 2019, a London derby between Tottenham Hotspur and Chelsea was marred by racist chants and monkey noises aimed at black player Antonio Rudiger, with the match stopped three times. The PFA said an inquity should be launched, whilst the British government said they would take action. Pundit Gary Neville said players should walk off in response to future occurrences. Tottenham's initial investigation into the racist chanting was said to be "inconclusive", while one Chelsea fan was arrested for a racially aggravated public order offence against Tottenham's Son Heung-min.

In February 2020 BBC Three released a file called Shame in the Game about racism in English football.

On 10 November 2020, FA chairman Greg Clarke resigned after referring to black players as “coloured players” and also said that there were “a lot more South Asians than there are Afro-Caribbeans” in the FA’s IT department because “they have different career interests”.

In December 2020, following completion of a month-long lockdown in England to help prevent the spread of COVID-19, a limited number of supporters were allowed back into some stadiums for the first time since March 2020. Before a match between Millwall and Derby County at The Den players of both teams took a knee to show support for the Black Lives Matter movement. Some Millwall supporters showed their disapproval of this action by booing during the gesture. This was construed as a racist act and condemned by Derby manager, Wayne Rooney, government minister, James Cleverly, and TV pundits, Gary Lineker and Micah Richards. Similar disapproval to taking a knee was also heard from some Colchester United supporters before their game against Grimsby Town at the Colchester Community Stadium. Similar jeering by some fans occurred during the taking of the knee on 15 December 2020 before a game between Cambridge United and Colchester United at the Abbey Stadium. The action was condemned by Cambridge manager, Mark Bonner. On 2 January 2021, AFC Bournemouth player, Junior Stanislas was subjected on Twitter to "multiple tweets of racial abuse alongside vile insults about the midfielder's family" after he had scored the only goal for Bournemouth in a 1-0 defeat of Stoke City.

In January 2021, Manchester United players Axel Tuanzebe and Antony Martial were abused online following a defeat in a game. A day later Romaine Sawyers of West Brom received racist abuse following a match, as did Reece James of Chelsea. On 30 January 2021, a 49-year old man from Kingswinford was arrested for racially abusing Sawyers. The same day, Manchester United forward Marcus Rashford received racist abuse on social media following a draw in a match. The increasing use of social media to racially abuse footballers was noted by Dan Roan of the BBC. In February 2021, Alex Jankewitz of Southampton suffered racist abuse on social media after the midfielder got sent off early in a game. Following a draw in February 2021, Tuanzebe received more racist abuse on social media after conceding a free-kick late in the game, which resulted in a last minute goal for the visitors. By February 2021, several clubs and players had decided against taking a knee before games, with Brentford feeling the gesture no longer had the required impact while Queens Park Rangers felt like it had become diluted. Similar reasons for stopping applied to Middlesbrough, with their player, Britt Assombalonga, calling for change after the initial success of taking a knee. Wilfried Zaha of Crystal Palace described the gesture as "degrading". He announced on 19 February 2021 that he would stop taking a knee before matches. Following Manchester United's draw against West Brom, Martial was again subjected to racist abuse on Instagram.

Analysis by Signify, a data science company who conducted a month-long in December 2020, revealed in February 2021 that there were 16 instances of targeted racist abuse towards Arsenal player Granit Xhaka and found 52 account users involved with online hate against Chelsea player Antonio Rüdiger. A few days later, Arsenal player Eddie Nketiah was sent a racist message underneath a Twitter post, becoming another high-profile footballer to be racially abused on social media.

On 24 February 2021, Walsall and Aston Villa released joint statements condemning racist abuse that Tyreik Wright had received on Instagram. The messages were reported to both the social media platform and West Midlands Police's Hate Crime Unit for investigation. On 26 February 2021, Derby County player Colin Kazim-Richards received racist abuse on social media after their 1–1 draw with Nottingham Forest. Derbyshire Police announced an investigation into the abuse. On 6 March 2021, Derby County decided to stop taking the knee before future games as they felt it was a symbolic gesture and therefore not enough.

After Crystal Palace’s goalless draw with Manchester United on 3 March 2021, Palace left back Patrick van Aanholt was subjected to racist abuse on social media. On 13 March 2021, Zaha became the first Premier League player to stop taking the knee. On 18 March 2021, Sheffield United player Rhian Brewster shared a racist message that he received from a user on Instagram, with Sheffield United offering Brewster their support and praising him for highlighting racist abuse. Manchester United midfielder Fred was racially abused on an Instagram post from 18 March 2021 after being at fault for Leicester City’s first goal in Manchester United’s 3–1 FA Cup quarter-final defeat, with the player saying “we are bigger and better than that”.

On 4 April 2021, Tottenham Hotspur midfielder Davinson Sánchez was subjected to racist abuse on Instagram following a 2–2 draw with Newcastle United.

On 6 April 2021, following their defeat by Real Madrid in the Champions League, Liverpool players Sadio Mané, Trent Alexander-Arnold and Naby Keïta were also subjected to racist abuse on social media. Liverpool said they would work with the authorities to identify and prosecute offenders but that "it will not be enough until the strongest possible preventative measures are taken".

On 11 April 2021 Tottenham player Son Heung-min suffered racist abuse following a match, with the club saying they would review the matter. On 24 April 2021 all clubs in the Premier League, the EFL and the Women’s Super League announced a boycott of all social media platforms for four days starting on 30 April 2021 in an effort to combat racist abuse and discrimination. Following this, Southampton player Nathan Tella opened up on the racist abuse he received after a game with Leeds earlier that season. The same month, Tella was racially abused again after Southampton’s defeat to Liverpool.

Following Manchester United’' defeat to Villarreal in the Europa League final on 26 May 2021, Marcus Rashford received “at least 70 racial slurs” online, with Manchester United adding that other members of the team were also targeted online after the defeat. The same week, Raheem Sterling and Kyle Walker were racially abused following Manchester City’s defeat to Chelsea in the Champions League final.

On 11 July 2021, Marcus Rashford, Jadon Sancho and Bukayo Saka received racist abuse of social media after they all missed during the penalty shootout in the UEFA Euro 2020 final. A mural of Rashford was vandalised, with the player saying he would not apologise for who he is, whilst Sancho later said that racists would never win, and Saka said he "instantly" knew he would receive racist abuse and hate. On 16 July 2021 it was announced that 5 people had been arrested. Instagram also said its moderation technology had failed to deal with racist abuse.

Tyrone Mings was critical of the Government's response to racist abuse. He accused Home Secretary Priti Patel of encouraging it after she had previously said that fans were right to boo players taking the knee, which she described as "gesture politics". Later Prime Minister Boris Johnson said online racists would be banned from football matches, while Tory MP Steve Baker said the Government should start backing players taking the knee. Also, Portsmouth announced they were investigating reports some of their youth players had engaged in racist abuse of England players. After an investigation, three youth players were subsequently released by Portsmouth.

On 18 September 2021, two Birmingham fans were arrested following an allegation of racist abuse aimed at Peterborough defender Nathan Thompson who made a complaint to referee Jarred Gillett during the match. On the same day, Swansea reported that their defender Rhys Williams was racially abused by a home fan in the second half of their game against Luton at Kenilworth Road. Following Crystal Palace’s win against Manchester City on 30 October 2021, Wilfried Zaha posted a series of racist messages that he had received on Instagram following the game.

In December 2021 a Southern Football League game between Tamworth and Biggleswade was abandoned at half-time due to alleged racist abuse. Later that month Arsenal reported a racist incident in a game away at Leeds United, which resulted in an arrest being made, and which the FA investigated. at the end of the month online racist abuse aimed at players was reported by Norwich City.

In January 2022 a man was arrested following alleged racist abuse aimed at pundit and ex-player Ashley Cole.

In February 2022 Chelsea settled a court case with former youth player who alleged racist abuse from coaches. Later that month Bradford City suspended a fan for alleged racist abuse, pending a police investigation.

In April 2022, the Met Police investigated an alleged racist comment made at a local football match. In June 2022 the London FA said that the allegation was not proven.

In May 2022, Crawley Town manager John Yems left the club following allegations that he had racially segregated the training ground changing rooms and had abused black and Asian players. Yems was charged by the FA in July 2022. In January 223 Yems was banned from football for 18 months after being found by the FA to have used "offensive, racist and Islamophobic" language, but they said it was "not conscious racism".

Also in May 2022, on the same day, two Burnley fans were arrested following racist gestures during a game against Tottenham, while the families of Brentford players Rico Henry and Ivan Toney were racially abused at an Everton game. Anti-racism charity Kick It Out spoke out against the incidents.

In June 2022, England national team manager Gareth Southgate spoke out about the need to educate young football fans about racism.

In July 2022, a Chesterfield fan allegedly racially abused two Bradford City players during a pre-season friendly. The matter was referred to the FA and the police.

In August 2022, a Wolverhampton Wanderers fan was tried at court after allegedly making a monkey gesture at pundit Rio Ferdinand during a game in May.

In September 2022, Stockport County condemned alleged racist chanting from their supporters.

In October 2022, Ivan Toney was racially abused online, as was Rhian Brewster. The abuse aimed at Toney resulted in an arrest after being deemed a hate crime, with the man admitting the offence and apologising. Toney also received online abuse in February 2023.

In November 2022, Rico Lewis was racially abused by Sevilla fans during a match. Later that month Chuba Akpom was racially abused online, with police involved.

In December 2022, Carlisle United fans were accused of racist chanting in a game against Bradford City.

In January 2023, Blackburn Rovers fans were accused of racism aimed at opposition goalkeeper Neil Etheridge during a match. A 15 year old was later questioned by police in relation to the incident.

In February 2023, there was a report of racial discrimination in the away end during a match between Bradford City and Mansfield Town. Later that month Ivan Toney, and Son Heung-min suffered racist abuse. A Chelsea fan was later banned for the abuse at Son.

In March 2023, Kyle Walker-Peters was racially abused. Later that month, the man who had abused Toney was given a 'landmark' stadium ban.

Examples
Date indicates when the incident occurred, rather than when an outcome was reached.

Scotland

Andrew Watson was the first black football player to represent Scotland. Watson never turned professional, however, so Arthur Wharton is sometimes reported as being the first black British footballer.

The book Race, Sport and British Society says there was racist abuse of Celtic player Paul Wilson by Rangers fans in the 1970s: "Rangers fans repeatedly bayed 'Wilson's a Paki' when Celtic played Rangers." There have been reports that some Rangers fans used to sing "I'd rather be a darkie than a Tim", with "Tim" referring to a Celtic fan. The book Sport and National Identity in the Post-War World states, "black players in Scotland were greeted with bananas thrown from the crowd and a barrage of 'monkey grunts', notably Mark Walters of Rangers and Paul Elliott of Celtic." On 2 January 1988, Rangers winger Mark Walters made his debut in the Old Firm derby match at Celtic Park. Rangers lost 2–0 and Walters was subjected to racist abuse from opposing Celtic fans, who were caught on camera chanting like monkeys, throwing fruit (mostly bananas), onto the pitch and dressing in monkey costumes. It was reported that Rangers fans used "implicit racism" on the same day by singing "I'd rather be a darkie than a Tim". Although Celtic denounced the perpetrators, the Scottish Football Association (SFA) remained silent. According to Walters, he experienced worse racial abuse in Edinburgh against Hearts. Following racist abuse aimed at Walters, Rangers banned some of their own season ticket holders. Andrew Smith from The Scotsman newspaper stated, "It is depressing to think that enforcement as much as enlightenment might account for Walters being the only black footballer in this country to have had bananas thrown at them."

Rangers captain Lorenzo Amoruso issued a public apology after a match in December 1999 for making racist comments against Borussia Dortmund's Nigerian striker Victor Ikpeba. In March 2003, Rangers fans were accused of racially abusing Bobo Baldé and Mohammed Sylla. Rangers Chairman John McClelland stated that, "There was such a crescendo during Saturday's match although I thought I heard noises of this kind I can't be 100% sure." In May 2004, Marvin Andrews condemned racism from some Rangers fans.

In November 2004, then-manager of Celtic Martin O'Neill suggested Neil Lennon was the subject of chants of a "racial and sectarian manner".

During a 2007 Scottish Cup tie, St Johnstone player Jason Scotland was the target of racist taunts by a handful of Motherwell fans. The offenders were promptly reprimanded by the spectators around them and were reported to police and match stewards. Motherwell Chairman John Boyle later issued an apology on behalf of the club. Motherwell were to court further controversy on 3 September 2007 when Laryea Kingston of Hearts was abused, although Motherwell refuted the claims.

In October 2009, Rangers player Maurice Edu said he was racially abused by some Rangers fans while leaving Ibrox after a UEFA Champions League defeat by Romanian club Unirea Urziceni. Edu wrote on Twitter, "Not sure what hurt more: result or being racially abused by couple of our own fans as I'm getting in my car."

Three Scottish judges ruled in June 2009 that "The Famine Song" is racist because it targets people of Irish origin. George Peat, president of the SFA, has suggested that the song causes embarrassment for Scottish football and should be stamped out. Peat has also stated that the SFA is determined to contribute to the eradication of offensive songs from Scottish football. In November 2008, a Rangers fan was found guilty of a breach of the peace (aggravated by religious and racial prejudice) for singing "The Famine Song" during a game against Kilmarnock. It was widely reported after an Old Firm game in February 2009, Rangers fans had sung "The Famine Song" at Celtic Park. The Famine Song was also sung in March 2011 at a Scottish football game by Rangers fans, nevertheless, Scottish Justice Secretary Kenny MacAskill described the match as a "great advert for Scottish football".

The Herald journalist Doug Gillon has written that "the sectarian intolerance which divides Scottish society [...] is rooted in anti-Irish racism".

In February 2011, in an Old Firm match at Celtic Park, a Celtic supporter was caught mocking black Rangers player El Hadji Diouf with monkey noises and gestures as he was about to take a corner kick.

In April 2011, then-manager of Celtic Neil Lennon received an explosive device in the post. Brian McNally described this as due to "anti-Catholic and anti-Irish racism". A number of high-profile Celtic fans also were sent suspected explosive devices. Leader of the Scottish Conservative Party Annabel Goldie MSP described bullets sent to Neil Lennon and a number of Celtic players as "racism and sectarianism". After an attempted assault on Neil Lennon at Hearts' Tynecastle Stadium, a motion against anti-Irish racism was lodged in the Scottish Parliament.

In October 2014, Celtic player Aleksandar Tonev received a seven-match ban for racially abusing an opponent.

In November 2018 Dennon Lewis spoke out about the racist abuse he has received from his club's (Falkirk's) own fans.

In October 2019 Rangers player Alfredo Morelos was allegedly racially abused by Hearts fans during a match between the two sides. Later that month Celtic manager Neil Lennon described racism in the sport as a "stain" and that players needed to be protected. In February 2020, a 12-year-old boy was charged with racist abuse aimed at Morelos.

Kilmarnock received a letter in December 2020 after a Boxing Day defeat, which contained racist abuse aimed at manager Alex Dyer. In January 2021, Dundee striker Jonathan Afolabi received racist messages following a victory in the Scottish Cup second round, which Dundee “utterly condemn”.

During a Europa League game between Rangers and Slavia Prague on 18 March 2021, Rangers manager Steven Gerrard claimed that Glen Kamara was racially abused by Ondřej Kúdela and called for UEFA to take action. However, Slavia Prague denied the accusation of racism, instead stating that Kúdela was assaulted by Kamara. In a related incident, Rangers forward Kemar Roofe was subjected to racist abuse on Instagram after getting sent off during that match.

In October 2021, Dundee United player Jeando Fuchs was allegedly racially abused by a Ross County fan during a match.

In October 2022, Hibernian player Jair Tavares was allegedly racially abused during a match against Dundee United.

Wales
On 10 February 2021, Swansea City midfielder Yan Dhanda who is of British Asian background, was racially abused on social media following Swansea’s defeat to Manchester City in the FA Cup. The incident was passed to South Wales Police for investigation. On 27 March 2021, following Wales’ 1-0 win against Mexico, players Ben Cabango and Rabbi Matondo were subjected to racist abuse on social media. Fellow Wales player, Gareth Bale said he would join a boycott of social media if more could not be done to combat racism across their platforms. Thierry Henry said he is removing himself from social media because of racism and social injustice. On 8 April 2021, Swansea City announced a week-long boycott of all social media platforms by first team members and by the academy and women's teams, staff of the club and from the club's official accounts.

Ukraine

In March 2019, English club Chelsea complained about alleged racism aimed at their player Callum Hudson-Odoi during a match against Dynamo Kiev. Later that month UEFA said they would investigate. He was later offered counselling.

In November 2019 Shakhtar Donetsk player Taison was sent-off after reacting to alleged racist abuse, and was also given a one-match ban.

Middle East

Syria 
A scandal took place during the 2018 World Cup qualifiers surrounding the match between Syria and Iran. The match was held in Kuala Lumpur during Monsoon season, making the match much more difficult and ending in a 0-0 tie. Iran then accused Syria of 'fixing' the game to prevent Iran from advancing to the World Cup.  This event shows the underlying racial tension between Syria and Iran and exemplifies how racial discrimination works its way into the sport.

Israel

Racist incidents date back to at least the 1970s, such as when Arab-Israeli player Jimmy Turk joined Hapoel Tel Aviv. Turk was subjected to anti-Arab abuse during nearly every game he played. According to Itzik Shanan, director of communications at the New Israel Fund, among most racist fans are supporters of Beitar Jerusalem, also Hapoel Tel Aviv fans have been using slogans promoting a Holocaust against Maccabi Tel Aviv. Israeli right-wing football supporters taunt Arab players during games, especially those who play for the mixed Arab-Jewish team Bnei Sakhnin. Ronny Rosenthal, playing for Israel's Maccabi Haifa in 1989, was subjected to anti-Semitic taunts.

Under Israeli law, football fans can be prosecuted for incitement of racial hatred. The "New Voices from the Stadium" program, run by the New Israel Fund (NIF) amasses a "racism index" that is reported to the media on a weekly basis, and teams have been fined and punished for the conduct of their fans. According to Steve Rothman, the NIF San Francisco director, "Things have definitely improved, particularly in sensitizing people to the existence of racism in Israeli society." In 2006, Israel joined Football Against Racism in Europe (FARE), a network set up to counter racism in football.

Oceania

Australia

At a 1994 match in Melbourne between the Croatian community supported Melbourne Knights and the Greek community supported South Melbourne, many ethnic slurs were exchanged between the two sets of supporters.

In October 2022 fans of Sydney United 58 allegedly made Nazi salutes during the Australia Cup final. One fan received a lifetime ban.

Central America

Honduras
In July 2021, the German Olympic team walked off the pitch in a friendly match against Honduras due to alleged racist abuse aimed at German player Jordan Torunarigha.

Mexico

In the first day of the Apertura 2006 tournament, fans of Santos Laguna made guttural sounds imitating a chimpanzee against the Panamanian player Felipe Baloy of Monterrey as he scored a goal. During the game, Santos Laguna's fans had also chanted other racial slurs towards Baloy, including "chango" ("monkey") and "come platano" ("banana eater"). The disciplinary commission of the Mexican Football Federation sanctioned the Santos club to a sum equivalent of 5,600 days of league minimum wage for the racist insults.

The racism went past the field in 2014 when Mexican politician, Carlos Trevino, called Brazilian football legend Ronaldinho an ape after he signed with a team in the Mexican league. He was quoted saying "I detest it all the more because people obstruct and flood the main avenues, causing me to spend two hours getting home … and all to see AN APE … A Brazilian, but an ape nonetheless. This has become a ridiculous circus." These outbursts were the reason why the Brazilian legend left the Mexican league after only one season.

In 2022, the Afro-Honduran player Carlos Fernandez decided to retire from Venados FC of the MX Expansion League, citing suffering from acts of racism by a teammate.

North America

United States

Overt displays of racism at U.S. soccer matches are extremely rare compared to the EU and Russia, in part, because the fan base of soccer in the U.S. is ethnically diverse and much younger. However, during a 24 May 2008 Major League Soccer (MLS) game between the Columbus Crew and the New England Revolution, Revolution forward Kheli Dube (originally from Zimbabwe) scored a goal against the Crew in the 89th minute of the game. An unidentified fan in the audience shouted out a racist slur. The incident was subsequently posted to the video sharing website YouTube, and MLS promised an investigation. In response to the epithet, Revolution player Shalrie Joseph reportedly made an obscene gesture towards the offending fan. Assuming that MLS could have identified the fan, Commissioner Don Garber promised to ban him.

In July 2013, two white coaches for the Los Angeles-based squad Chivas USA filed a discrimination suit against the team. In this suit, they claimed that Chivas (which was controlled by their parent club in Guadalajara had become prejudicial after ending the contracts or trading off non Mexican/Mexican-American players and coaching staff following several unsuccessful seasons, thus they were wrongfully terminated. After the allegations were presented to a wider audience on HBO's Real Sports with Bryant Gumbel, MLS released a statement saying, "MLS has zero tolerance for discrimination or prejudice of any kind....And although allegations in this lawsuit raise serious issues it would not be appropriate for us to say anything more while the litigation is ongoing." Nothing significant happened following the accusations. The club was folded after the 2014 MLS season, eventually being replaced with the unrelated team Los Angeles FC.

On 28 August 2020, MLS and the National Women’s Soccer League launched investigations into allegations that Real Salt Lake and Utah Royal FC owner Dell Loy Hansen used racist language in the workplace. In September 2020, La Galaxy II announced that they released defender Omar Ontiveros in the wake of an on-field racist incident with San Diego Loyal player Elijah Martin.

In September 2022, Taxi Fountas was accused of using the n-word towards Damion Lowe.

South America

Argentina

On 14 April 2005, the Quilmes player Leandro Desabato was arrested for racially abusing Grafite, a black Brazilian player. He was held for 40 hours, but no charges were brought against him after Grafite decided not to press charges.

Damien Perez of Arsenal de Sarandi labelled his opponent Jerry Bengston a "negro de mierda", roughly translated to "black piece of shit". This is a common racial slur in Latin America. One Argentinian player, Alberto Raimundi even felt it was appropriate to use the slur when describing an opponent during a post-game interview.

Brazil 

Racism in Brazilian football was discussed by the media in the run-up to the 2014 FIFA World Cup, held in the country.

In September 2014, Grêmio were banned from competing in the Copa do Brasil after some of their fans were seen racially abusing an opposition player.

Bolivia 
In Wilstermann 0-2 loss to Blooming in March 2019, black Brazilian players Serginho, playing for the former team, left the field after being subjected to monkey chants by the opposition fans. Afterwards Serginho stated that racism must end in the Bolivian league.

Chile
Emilio Rentería, of Colombian-Venezuelan origin was forced off the field crying due to extreme racial abuse during a game played in the Chilean league. After scoring a goal against the opposing team, Renteria celebrated on the side of the pitch. After this the crowd began to chant numerous racist slurs forcing him to leave the game.  Chilean senator later apologized to Renteria and made a joint effort to grow awareness for the problem in Chile.

Ecuador 
In the 2006 World Cup held in Germany, The Ecuadorian team was the target of racism by an Argentinian commentator. The commentator was said to have commented on the color of the Ecuadorians' dark skin. After this statement, the commentator continued, saying that the Ecuadorians were not real Ecuadorians, and were from Nigeria. His comments started an uproar in Ecuador over national identity.

Peru 
Jhoel Herrera a player for Real Garcilaso of the Peruvian first division brought family to his opponent's home stadium to celebrate mother's day. Herrera endured 90 minutes of racist verbal abuse from the opposing fans and players while the ref seemed to not react. At the end of the game, Herrera's mother was caught on tape being physically abused by the racist opposing team's fans.

See also

 Football Against Racism in Europe
 Judenklub
 Racism Breaks the Game
 Serbia v Albania (UEFA Euro 2016 qualifying)
 Show Racism the Red Card
 Stand Up Speak Up

References

External links
 
 BBC report on racism on Polish stadiums
 Football Unites, Racism Divides
 Show Racism The Red Card
 Let's Kick Racism Out Of Football
 Stand Up Speak Up
  One Game For All, Without Racism
 Mark Walters debut
 Neil Lennon bomb

 
Association football issues
History of association football
association football